In Australia, an Avenue of Honour is a memorial avenue of trees, with each tree symbolising a person. The tradition, which originated in the Goldfields region of Victoria, Australia, is an important part of Australian culture.  There are 547 known avenues of honour in Australia, in all states and territories except the Northern Territory. Over half are in Victoria.  

Most avenues are in remembrance of those who fought or died in war, particularly World War I (1914–1918), although the earliest recorded avenues were planted in remembrance of Australia's participation in the Second Boer War (1899-1902). Since soldiers were grouped by the place they were recruited, a military defeat often meant all of the men of eligible age from the town were killed in the same battle. Many of the avenue's trees include metal plaques naming the victims.

Many of these avenues now feature large, established trees and exotic species.

Several of these avenues are listed on the Victorian Heritage Register; most others are afforded local levels of heritage protection through the various Local government in Australia and the National Trust of Australia; however, many such avenues have since been affected by road development.

An online project titled "Avenues of Honour 1915-2015" (www.avenuesofhonour.org) has been established by Treenet, the urban tree research and education organisation based at the University of Adelaide's Waite Arboretum.

State significant avenues

 Ballarat — The longest (22 kilometres and 3,912 trees) of the Avenues of Honour, made ever grander by its Arch of Victory.
Bacchus Marsh Road — The avenue of Dutch Elm trees serves as a tribute to local people who enlisted in the First World War. The 281 trees were simultaneously planted on the call of a bugle in 1918.
Eurack
Macedon-Woodend Road, Shire of Macedon Ranges

Other Victorian Avenues of Honour
 Anglesea – relatively unusual in that flowering gums (corymbia ficifolia) were planted. Seventy-two trees were planted but only three or four remain.
 Ballarat East — A second lesser known Avenue of Honour once marked the eastern entrance to Ballarat at Victoria Street. A handful of trees remain on one side of the road, the rest having been demolished, most during construction of the rail flyover in the 1960s.
Macedon
 Booroopki
 Buchan South
 Daylesford
 Hotspur
 Kongwak
 Lakes Entrance
 Lysterfield
 Wandin North - also planted with flowering gums.
 Woodend North
 Ballarat Orphanage's Arthur Kenny Avenue

Avenues of Honour outside Victoria
 Yungaburra, Queensland
 Manly Vale, Sydney, New South Wales – established in 2005 to commemorate the service and sacrifice of Merchant Navy personnel in two world wars.
 Cowra, New South Wales
 O'Connell, New South Wales
 Albany, Western Australia
 Armadale, Western Australia
 Kings Park, Western Australia - May Drive, Lovekin Drive and Marri Walk 
 Hobart, Tasmania

See also
 Avenue (landscape)

References

Further reading
 
 Taffe, Michael. Victoria's Avenues of Honour to the Great War Lost to the Landscape. (Bachelor of Arts Hons). University of Melbourne. 2006. 
 Taffe, Michael. '90th Anniversary of our Avenues of Honour', Australian Garden History Journal p.24, Vol.17 No.5 May/June 2006.
 Taffe, Michael. “A New Nation – A New Landscape: Victoria’s Great War Avenues of Honour.” Paper presented at the Australian Garden History Society 2012 Conference. https://www.gardenhistorysociety.org.au/wp-
 Taffe, Michael. “Keeping Memory Green.” Historic Gardens Review 32 (2015): 18–21.
 Taffe, Michael. First World War Avenues of Honour: Social History through the Landscape. (PhD Thesis) Federation University, Ballarat. 2018.

Australian military memorials
Avenues (landscape)